Baltic Basketball League 2008–09 was the fifth edition of Baltic Basketball League.

Teams for the Baltic Basketball League 2008–09

Teams for the Baltic Basketball League Challenge Cup 2008–09

Elite Division

Regular Season standings

Quarterfinals 
ASK Riga vs BC Šiauliai

 

 

BC Kalev/Cramo vs Tartu Ülikool/Rock

Semifinals

Third place game

Final

Bracket 

Baltic Basketball League seasons
2008–09 in European basketball leagues
2008–09 in Lithuanian basketball
2008–09 in Estonian basketball
2008–09 in Latvian basketball
2008–09 in Swedish basketball